The 1946 South Ayrshire by-election was held on 7 February 1946.  The byelection was held due to the death of the incumbent Labour MP, Alexander Sloan.  It was won by the Labour candidate Emrys Hughes, with a swing against his party of less than 1%.

References

South Ayrshire by-election
South Ayrshire by-election, 1946
South Ayrshire by-election
South Ayrshire by-election
Ayrshire, South